Shmidt Subglacial Basin is a large subglacial basin situated southward of Knox Coast in East Antarctica. Named by the Soviet Antarctic Expedition, 1957, after Soviet academician, Professor Otto Yu. Shmidt (1891-1956).

Structural basins of Antarctica
Landforms of Wilkes Land